The Leeds Road Fever Hospital in Bradford, West Yorkshire, England, was a  founded in 1867. In 1962, it was one of the hospitals that were quarantined during an epidemic of smallpox in Bradford.

References 

Hospitals in Bradford